Bajč (Hungarian Bajcs, Hungarian pronunciation:) is a village and municipality in the Komárno District in the Nitra Region of south-west Slovakia.

Geography
It has a population of about 1,240 people.

History
In the 9th century, the territory of Bajč became part of the Kingdom of Hungary. In historical records the village was first mentioned in 1312.
After the Austro-Hungarian army disintegrated in November 1918, Czechoslovak troops occupied the area, later acknowledged internationally by the Treaty of Trianon. Between 1938 and 1945 Bajč once more became part of Miklós Horthy's Hungary through the First Vienna Award. From 1945 until the Velvet Divorce, it was part of Czechoslovakia. Since then it has been part of Slovakia.

Demographics
The village is about 58% Hungarian, 40% Slovak and 2% Romany.

Genealogical resources

The records for genealogical research are available at the state archive "Statny Archiv in Nitra, Slovakia"

 Roman Catholic church records (births/marriages/deaths): 1827-1895 (parish A)
 Reformated church records (births/marriages/deaths): 1795-1942
 Census records 1869 of Bajc are available at the state archive.

See also
 List of municipalities and towns in Slovakia

Facilities
The village has a public library, and a  football pitch.

References

External links
https://web.archive.org/web/20080216163414/http://www.ocubajc.sk/
Surnames of living people in Bajc

Villages and municipalities in the Komárno District
Hungarian communities in Slovakia